Arjun Nair (born 12 April 1998) is an Australian cricketer. He is an All-Rounder who bats in right hand and bowls right arm off-spin. He made his first-class debut for New South Wales in February 2016 in the 2015–16 Sheffield Shield against South Australia at International Sports Stadium, Coffs Harbour. He is also a part of the Sydney Thunder squad in the Big Bash League. He made his Twenty20 (T20) debut for Sydney Thunder in the 2016–17 Big Bash League season on 22 December 2016. He graduated from Patrician Brothers' College, Blacktown in 2015.

References

External links
 

1998 births
Living people
Australian cricketers
Cricketers from New South Wales
New South Wales cricketers
Cricketers from the Australian Capital Territory
Sydney Thunder cricketers
Cricket Australia XI cricketers
Australian sportspeople of Indian descent
Australian people of Malayali descent